Meromyza pratorum is a species of fly in the family Chloropidae, the grass flies. It is found in the Palearctic. The larva feeds on Poaceae such as Calamagrostis epigeios and probably other species of the genus Calamagrostis, and Leymus arenarius.

References

Chloropinae
Insects described in 1830